State Trunk Highway 53 (often called Highway 53, STH-53 or WIS 53) was  a state highway in the U.S. state of Wisconsin. WIS 53 used to travel along these present-day routes:
Wisconsin Highway 121 from Arcadia to Independence. WIS 53 had travel along present-day WIS 121 until 1923.
Wisconsin Highway 93 from Independence to Whitehall. WIS 53 had travel along present-day WIS 93 until 1923.
Wisconsin Highway 95 from Fountain City to Neillsville. WIS 53 had always been traveling along at least a large portion of present-day WIS 95 until 1926.

Reference

53